Christine Williams (January 7, 1945 – November 22, 2017) was a model, actress and artist who was Playboy magazine's Playmate of the Month for its October 1963 issue. Her centerfold was photographed by Mario Casilli. She was born in Basingstoke, England.

Filmography

Films
 Funny Girl (1968) (uncredited) .... Ziegfeld Girl
 Otto und die nackte Welle (1968) .... Model
 The Swinger (1966) (uncredited) .... Model #7
 The Naked World of Harrison Marks (1965) .... Herself
 For Those Who Think Young (1964)

Television
 "The Monkees" - "Wild Monkees" (1967) .... Jan
 "The Beverly Hillbillies"
 "Jethro's Pad" (1966) .... First Kitty Kat
 "Brewster's Baby" (1966) .... Kitty Kat Showgirl
 "Petticoat Junction" - "The Windfall" (1966) .... First Showgirl
 "Burke's Law" - "Who Killed Cynthia Royal?" (1963) .... Chorus Girl

See also
 List of people in Playboy 1960–1969

References

External links 
 
 

1945 births
2017 deaths
1960s Playboy Playmates
People from Basingstoke